Ghulām Muṣṭafā al-Burdwānī, or alternatively Golam Mostafa Bardhamani, was an 18th-century Islamic scholar and poet from Burdwan in western Bengal. He is mentioned in the works of Abd al-Hayy al-Lucknawi and Muhammad Ishaq Bhatti, where he is described as one of the leading scholars in the fields of Islamic jurisprudence during his time.

Biography
Ghulam Mustafa was born into a Bengali Muslim family from Burdwan in the Bengal Subah. He became a senior student of Abdul Ali Bahrul Ulum (son and student of Dars-i Nizami deviser Nizamuddin Sihalivi) during his studies at the Jalalia Madrasa in the village of Bohar. He was a follower of the Hanafi madhhab. After completing his studies, he served as the Mufti (head jurist) of Etawah in Hindustan for many years. He then transferred to Birbhum, near Burdwan, in Bengal until the end of his life. Ghulam Mustafa was also a distinguished poet of the Persian language.

See also
Jalaluddin Tabrizi

References

Bengali Muslim scholars of Islam
People from Bardhaman
People from Etawah
People from Birbhum district
18th-century Bengalis
18th-century Persian-language poets
18th-century Muslim theologians
Hanafis
Muftis
Poets from West Bengal